Roberto Carballés Baena was the defending champion but retired in the second round facing Maximilian Marterer.

Marterer won the title after defeating Mohamed Safwat 6–2, 6–4 in the final.

Seeds

Draw

Finals

Top half

Bottom half

References
Main Draw
Qualifying Draw

Morocco Tennis Tour - Kenitra - Singles
Morocco Tennis Tour – Kenitra
2016 Morocco Tennis Tour